M. Krishnan Nair (2 November 1926 – 10 May 2001) was an Indian film director of Malayalam films. He directed over 100 films. He also directed 18 Tamil movie including  four films starring M. G. Ramachandran and two Telugu movies, one each with superstars N. T. Rama Rao and Krishna Eminent filmmakers including Hariharan, K. Madhu, S. P. Muthuraman, Bharathiraja and Joshiy apprenticed under him as assistant directors.

In 2000, he was honoured with the J. C. Daniel Award, Kerala government's highest honour for contributions to Malayalam cinema.

Personal life
He was married to K. Sulochana Devi, and had three sons. His eldest son K. Jayakumar is a poet, lyricist and a former bureaucrat who currently serves as the Vice Chancellor of Malayalam University. His second son is Harikumar, while his youngest son Sreekumar Krishnan Nair is a film director best known for directing O' Faby, India's first live-action/animation hybrid feature film.

Selected filmography
1987 Kalam Mari Katha Mari
1985 Puzhayozhukum Vazhi
1984 Manithali
1983 Maniyara
1983 Paalam
1982 Mylanji
1982 Oru Kunju Janikkunnu
1980 Dwik Vijayam
1980 Rajaneegandhi
1979 Ajnatha Theerangal
1979 Kalliyankattu Neeli
1979 Oru Raagam Pala Thaalam
1978 Ashoka Vanam
1978 Aval Kanda Lokam
1978 Ithanente Vazhi
1978 Rowdy Ramu
1978 Urakkom Varaatha Rathrikal
1977 Madhura Swapanam
1977 Santha Oru Devatha
1977 Thaalappoly
1977 Yatheem
1976 Amma
1976 Neela Sari
1976 Oorukku Uzhaippavan (Tamil)
1974 Suprabhatham
1973 Bhadradeepam
1973 Thottavadi
1973 Yamini
1973 Thalai Prasavam (Tamil)
1972 Manthrakodi
1972 Naan Yen Pirandhen (Tamil)
1972 Annamitta Kai (Tamil)
1971 Rickshawkaran (Tamil)
1971 Agnimrigam
1971 Tapaswini
1970 Bheekara Nimishangal
1970 Chitti Chellelu (Telugu)
1970 Detective 909
1970 Palunkupaathram
1970 Sabarimala Shri Dharmasastha
1970 Tara
1970 Vivahitha
1969 Anaachadanam
1969 Mannippu (Tamil)
1969 Jwala
1969 Maganey Nee Vazhga (Tamil)
1969 Padicha Kallan
1968 Circar Express (Telugu)
1968 Agni Pareeksha
1968 Anchu Sundariakal
1968 Inspector
1968 Kadal
1968 Karthika
1968 Paadunna Puzha
1968 Muthu Chippi (Tamil)
1967 Agniputhri
1967 Cochin Express
1967 Collector Malathy
1967 Kaanatha Veshangal
1967 Khadeeja
1967 Kudumbam (Tamil)
1966 Kalithozhan
1966 Kalyana Rathriyil
1966 Kanaka Chilanga
1966 Kusruthy Kuttan
1966 Pinchu Hridhayam
1965 Kadathukaran
1965 Kathirunna Nikah
1965 Kattu Thulasi
1965 Kavya Mela
1964 Bharthavu
1964 Karutha Kai
1964 Kutti Kuppayam
1963 Kaattu Mynah
1962 Viyarpintae Vila
1960 Aalukkoru Veedu (Tamil)
1955 Aniyathi
1955 C.I.D

References

External links
 

Tamil film directors
Malayalam film directors
1926 births
2001 deaths
Film directors from Thiruvananthapuram
20th-century Indian film directors
J. C. Daniel Award winners